Miss Grand Brazil 2022 was the fourth edition of the Miss Grand Brazil beauty pageant, held on July 28, 2022, at the theater Caesb in Águas Claras, Federal District. Thirty-one contestants, who qualified for the national stage either through state contests held by the Concurso Nacional de Beleza (CNB Brazil) or being appointed, competed for the title, of whom a 26-year-old financial planner and international model from Marília representing the Alto Cafezal, Isabella Menin, was elected the winner. She then represented Brazil at the Miss Grand International 2022 held that year on October 25 in Indonesia, and won the first place, making her the first Brazilian representative to win the Miss Grand International title.

The pageant's entire tournament was incorporated into the program of the Brasilia Festival, which was organized by the Center-West Art Center (NACO), in collaboration with the State Secretariat of Culture and Creative Economy of the Federal District.

The contest was showcased under the direction of Henrique Fontes, president of the CNB Brazil, who has had the Miss Grand Brazil license since 2015. The grand gala of the event was televised on Miss Grand International's Youtube channel, GrandTV. Juliano Crema served as the Portuguese host, while Gabrielle Vilela, Miss Grand Brazil 2018, was the English MC.

Competition
In the grand final competition held on July 28, the results of the preliminary competition—which consisted of the swimsuit and evening gown competition and the closed-door interview—determined the 16 semifinalists. The top 16 competed in the swimsuit round and were narrowed down to the top 12, who then competed in the evening gown round and were further cut down to the last nine finalists. The nine qualified candidates delivered a speech related to the pageant campaign, "Stop wars and violence," which determined the last five semifinalists, who then competed in the question and answer portion. After this, Miss Grand Brazil 2019 and her four runners-up were announced.

The panel of judges for the grand final contest includes;

 Patricia Godói – Lawyer and Miss Brasil Universe 1991 and Reina Sudamericana 1991
  Janaína Dias – Businessperson and owner of Janaína Dias Ateliê de Flores
 Fábio Paula – Journalist of Folha de S.Paulo
 Guilhermina Montarroyos – Reina Hispanoamericana Brazil 2022 
 João Ricardo Dias – Miss Brazil CNB content creator 
 Janssen Machado – Director of La Renovence Groups
 Caroline Teixeira – Miss Brazil CNB 2021
 Flávia Cavalcante – Journalist, presenter, and Miss Universe Brazil 1989
 Lorena Rodrigues – Journalist, model, and Miss Grand Brasil 2021

The summary of the selection process is shown below.

Result

Main placement

Special awards

Note
  Automatically qualified for the top 16 finalists after winning the fast tacks, Miss Popularity, or La Renovence challenge.

Contestants
Thirty-one contestants competed for the title of Miss Grand Brazil 2022.

 Alto Cafezal – Isabella Menin
 – Tainara Santos
 Cânions Paulistas – Stephanie Pavani
 – Isadora Katlen
 Circuito das Frutas – Nina Spasiani
 – Rosa Carvalho
 – Gabriela Souza
 – Taynnara Gimenez
 Ilhabela – Bruna Bonomo
 Ilha Comprida – Nicole Hadassa
 – Thaís Fischer
 – Maythe Varzoni
 – Bia Martins
 – Malu Camargos
 Norte Mato-Grossense – Bárbara Reis
 – Shanti Devi
 – Chaene Guedes
 – Gabriela Borges
 – Julia Ohanna
 – Ana Paula Souza
 Plano Piloto – Mohaly França
 – Keila Campbel
 – Cristianne Medeiros
 – Vitória Brodt
 – Vitória Ribeiro
 – Sthefany Aragão
 – Larissa Galvão
 Sul Mineiro – Sara Santos
 – Khalynne Silva
 Vale do Aço –  Víviane Lópes
 Zona da Mata Mineira – Maria Azevedo

References

External links

 

Miss Grand Brazil
Grand Brazil